The Kazan International Festival of Muslim Cinema (KIFMC) was created in 2005. It takes place at the beginning of September in the town of Kazan, Russia.

History
Initially it was supposed to be a mobile festival between Muslim regions in Russia and other States of the Muslim world, and the city of Kazan was chosen to be a start point, because it is the biggest Islamic city in the northern hemisphere. The President of the Republic Tatarstan  (an autonomous republic within the Russian Federation) insisted that KIFMC should be the Culture Brand of the capital of the Republic "Kazan", which became the permanent residence for the festival,  and city name has been added to the name of the festival.

External links
 The 8th Kazan International Festival of Muslim Cinema 
 Kazan International Festival of Muslim Cinema (KIFMC)

Islamic culture
Film festivals in Russia
Islam in Kazan